Boni station (also called Boni Avenue station) is a Manila Metro Rail Transit (MRT) station situated on Line 3.  It is located in Mandaluyong and is named so due to its proximity to Boni Avenue, which is in turn named after the nickname of Bonifacio Javier, a World War II guerilla leader and former mayor of Mandaluyong. It has several restaurants and shops that surround the station, including a public market located across the train station.

It is the eighth station for trains headed to Taft Avenue and the sixth station for trains headed to North Avenue. It is one of five stations on the line where passengers can catch a train going in the opposite direction without paying a new fare due to the station's layout. The other four stations are Araneta Center-Cubao, Shaw Boulevard, Buendia, Ayala, and Taft Avenue. Excluding Araneta Center-Cubao station, it is also one of four stations on the line with its concourse level located above the platform.

Nearby landmarks
The station serves Mandaluyong and the new Pioneer District. Its nearest landmarks include Forum Robinsons, Go Hotel, and Robinsons Cybergate; Victor R. Potenciano Medical Center; GA Twin Towers; SMDC Light Residences; TV5 Media Center; Pioneer Woodlands Condominium; and Paragon Plaza Building. It is also located near the national headquarters of the Philippine Red Cross, Globe Telecom Plaza (former headquarters of Globe Telecom on Pioneer Street) and Rizal Technological University on Boni Avenue. The station is interconnected with SMDC Light Residences, particularly Light Mall, and Pioneer Woodlands Condominium through respective elevated walkways at the east.

Transportation links
Jeepneys, buses, taxis, and tricycles are available outside the station, particularly at EDSA and as well as Pioneer and Pinatubo streets. A major jeepney terminal is located in the area, at Metromart Market, and jeepneys leaving from the terminal head for western Mandaluyong, Pasig, and Manila (Stop and Shop in the vicinity of Santa Mesa). A major tricycle terminal is also found nearby, serving destinations in Mandaluyong. Its proximity to Rizal Technological University and other colleges in the area makes the station a popular stop for students.

See also
List of rail transit stations in Metro Manila
Manila Metro Rail Transit System Line 3

References

Manila Metro Rail Transit System stations
Railway stations opened in 1999
Buildings and structures in Mandaluyong
1999 establishments in the Philippines